Osijek-Baranja County is a county in Croatia, located in northeastern Slavonia and Baranja. Its center is Osijek. Other towns include Đakovo, Našice, Valpovo, Belišće, and Beli Manastir.

History 

Osijek-Baranja County was established in 1992, with border changes in 1997.

Stifolder
The Stifolder or Stiffoller Shvove are a Roman Catholic subgroup of the so called Danube Swabians. Their ancestors once came ca. 1717 - 1804 from the Hochstift Fulda and surroundings (Roman Catholic Diocese of Fulda), and settled in the Baranja area, such as in Jagodnjak, etc. They retained their own German dialect and culture, until the end of WW2. After WW2, the majority of Danube Swabians were expelled to Allied-occupied Germany and Allied-occupied Austria as a consequence of the Potsdam Agreement.
Only a few people can speak the old Stiffolerisch Schvovish dialect. A salami is named after this people.

Administrative divisions

Cities and towns

Municipalities

County government
Current Župan (prefect): Ivan Anušić (HDZ)

The county assembly is composed of 55 representatives, organized as follows:
 Croatian Democratic Union (HDZ) 25
 Independent 10
 Social Democratic Party of Croatia (SDP) 6
 Bridge of Independent Lists (Most) 4
 Human Shield (Živi zid) 3
 Croatian People's Party (HNS) 3
 Croatian Peasants Party (HSS) 2
 Croatian Social Liberal Party (HSLS) 1
 Croatian Democratic Assembly of Slavonia and Baranja (HDSSB) 1

Demographics 

Several minorities in Osijek-Baranja County have their Minority Councils. Here is the list of minorities' Councils with links to their respective Statutes and name of Osijek-Baranja County in their language.

Bosniaks, Montenegrins, Macedonians, Rusyns and Slovenes have one representative each.

The Serbian Joint Council of Municipalities, consisting of Erdut, Jagodnjak and Šodolovci municipalities is active within the county.

Features

The Kopački Rit nature park is located within this county. Other notable attractions in the country include Đakovo Cathedral, Tvrđa, Bizovac spa, Đakovački vezovi, Osijek Zoo and Aquarium, Urban Fest Osijek, Red fićo in Osijek, Battle of Batina monument, Eastern Continental wine region and other.

See also
Baranya County of the Kingdom of Hungary
Virovitica County of the Kingdom of Croatia-Slavonia

Sources

External links

 

 
Counties of Croatia
Slavonia
Baranya (region)